Pseudathyma callina, the calline false sergeant, is a butterfly in the family Nymphalidae. It is found in Nigeria, Cameroon, Gabon, the Republic of the Congo, the Central African Republic, the Democratic Republic of the Congo (Sankuru and Lualaba), and north-western Zambia. The habitat consists of forests.

References

Butterflies described in 1898
Pseudathyma
Butterflies of Africa
Taxa named by Henley Grose-Smith